SMS Leopard was a torpedo cruiser (Torpedoschiff) of the Austro-Hungarian Navy. She and her sister ship, were part of a program to build up Austria-Hungary's fleet of torpedo craft in the 1880s. Leopard was laid down in January 1885, launched in September 1885, and completed in March 1886. She was armed with a battery of two  guns and ten  guns, along with four  torpedo tubes.

Leopard spent much of her career in the main Austro-Hungarian fleet. During this period, she visited Spain for the 1888 Barcelona Universal Exposition, and took part in an international naval demonstration off Crete in 1897 in an attempt to limit the Greco-Turkish War. From 1900, Leopard made two major overseas deployments, including a tour of the Pacific Ocean in 1900–1901, and a stint in the East Asia squadron in 1907–1909. Upon returning to Austria-Hungary, the ship was modernized in 1910 and then decommissioned in May 1914, shortly before the start of World War I in July. The ship was immediately reactivated and stationed in Pola as a guard ship, where she remained for the duration of the conflict. After Austria-Hungary's defeat, Leopard was ceded to Britain as a war prize and sold to ship breakers in Italy in 1920.

Design

In the early 1880s, Vizeadmiral (Vice Admiral) Maximilian Daublebsky von Sterneck pressed for new naval construction to strengthen the chronically neglected Austro-Hungarian Navy, but realizing that new ironclad battleships could not be built given the parliaments' unwillingness to fund such expensive projects, he requested a pair of small protected cruisers. These ships would be used defensively against the larger and more expensive ironclads possessed by Austria-Hungary's rivals. Because the small Austro-Hungarian shipbuilding industry lacked experience building modern cruising vessels, the contracts for the new ships were given to Armstrong in the United Kingdom, though the experience the navy gained was used to build the follow-on cruiser  domestically.

She displaced  at normal loading. Her superstructure was fairly minimal, consisting primarily of a small conning tower forward. The ship had an inverted bow and a forecastle deck that extended for the first third of the vessel. She was fitted with a pair of pole masts. Her crew numbered 186 officers and men.

The ship's propulsion system consisted of a pair of two-cylinder vertical compound steam engines that drove a pair of screw propellers. Steam was provided by six cylindrical fire-tube boilers that were trunked into two funnels.

The ship was armed with a main battery of two  35-caliber (cal.) guns manufactured by Krupp in single mounts, which were placed in sponsons amidships, one per side. These were supported by a secondary battery of four  quick-firing guns and six 47 mm revolver cannon, which provided close-range defense against torpedo boats. The ship's primary offensive armament was her four  torpedo tubes. The torpedo tubes were located singly, in the bow, stern, and at either beam. Leopard was protected with a thin  armored deck.

Service

The keel for Leopard was laid down in January 1885 at the Armstrong shipyard in Elswick in Britain. Her completed hull was launched on 10 September that year, and fitting-out work was completed on 31 March 1886. On 1 April, the Austro-Hungarian crew took possession of the ship and left for home, arriving in Pola on 2 May. Upon arrival, she was taken into the shipyard to have her armament installed, including her torpedo tubes in 1887. This was the largest squadron of the Austro-Hungarian Navy that had operated outside the Adriatic. While on the way back home, Leopard, Custoza, Kaiser Max, and Prinz Eugen stopped in Malta.

On 9 June 1888, Leopard made a stop in Gravosa. While on training exercises off the island of Curzola on 25 June, Leopard ran aground, but was able to free herself under her own power two days later. In the subsequent investigation, the ship's captain was judged to be at fault and was sentenced to 30 days' house arrest. On 4 July, the ship was decommissioned in Pola for repairs for damage sustained in the accident. She spent the years 1889 and 1890 in reserve, before returning to service with the main squadron from 8 May 1891 to 28 June. Leopard was laid up in 1892, but served with the active squadron from 8 May 1893 to 1 August. Another lengthy reserve period followed between 1894 and 1896.

In February 1897, Leopard deployed to Crete to serve in the International Squadron, a multinational force made up of ships of the Austro-Hungarian Navy, French Navy, Imperial German Navy, Italian Royal Navy (Regia Marina), Imperial Russian Navy, and British Royal Navy that intervened in the 1897-1898 Greek uprising on Crete against rule by the Ottoman Empire. The International Squadron operated off Crete until December 1898, but Austria-Hungary, displeased with the decision to create an autonomous Cretan State under the suzerainty of the Ottoman Empire, withdrew its ships in March 1898.

From 1 October 1900 to 1 October 1901, Leopard embarked on a tour of the Pacific Ocean, which included a visit to Australia, Polynesia, and various ports in East Asia. Leopard carried a group of naval cadets on the training cruise, and she brought a memorial to the island of Guadalcanal, where men from the gunboat  had died during their expedition in the Pacific Ocean. During this period, she was temporarily assigned to the East Asia squadron, under the command of then-Captain Anton Haus, who went on to command the Austro-Hungarian fleet during World War I. After returning to Austria-Hungary, Leopard served with the main squadron in 1902 and 1903, was laid up in 1904, and served with the fleet again in 1905. She made another deployment to East Asian waters in 1907–1909, departing Austro-Hungarian waters on 20 September 1907. She visited numerous Chinese, Russian, and Japanese ports, and cruised up the Yangtze river; she was relieved by her sister Panther on 13 April 1909, allowing her to return home.

Leopard was placed in reserve from 1910 to 1913; during this period, she was rearmed, losing most of her gun battery and being equipped with four  45-cal. guns and ten 47 mm QF guns. On 14 February 1914, she was reactivated for service with the torpedo training school, a role she filled until 15 May, when she was decommissioned again. Following the outbreak of World War I, she was reactivated for coastal defense, assigned to the II Coastal Defense Division. She was stationed as a harbor guard ship in Pola, where she remained for the duration of the war. Under the terms of the Treaty of Saint-Germain-en-Laye, Britain received Leopard as a war prize in 1920, but she was instead sold to ship breakers in Italy and scrapped.

Notes

References
 
 
 
 
 
 

 

Panther-class cruisers
Ships built on the River Tyne
1885 ships
World War I cruisers of Austria-Hungary
Ships built by Armstrong Whitworth